Navid Akhavan (born 9 June 1980 in Tehran) is an Iranian-German actor and film director. He is also known as Navid Navid.

Navid was born in Teheran, Iran. Due to the Iran–Iraq War Navid (age 4) escaped with his family from his native country. After briefly living in the United States, they immigrated to Germany in 1985.

Navid grew up speaking English, German, and Persian. Due to his fathers profession, an event manager, he was introduced to the stage and audience from an early age. He performed on stage for the first time when he was eight years old. Until the age of 16 he was the opening act of dozens of concerts.

After he graduated in 2001 from the "Schauspiel Zentrum", a school for performing arts in Cologne, Germany, he started to work as an actor in film, TV and theatre. He played the role of Lady Macbeth in William Shakespeares Macbeth and Romeo in Romeo and Juliet at the Altonaer Theater in Hamburg, Germany.

In 2003, his first leading role in a film gained him a nomination at the Munich Filmfestival in the category "Best Actor in a Leading Role" for his portrayal of Yunes in Elmar Fischer's Fremder Freund. In the same year the film won the acclaimed First Steps Award, the Digital Visions Award as well as the Audience Award at the Filmz Mainz film festival.

His other leading roles include Mohsen in Salami Aleikum and Jamal in 45 Minutes to Ramallah (both comedies directed by Ali Samadi Ahadi) as well as the drama For a Moment Freedom (written and directed by Arash T. Riahi), which won 30 awards at international film festivals and was the Austrian entry for the Academy Awards in 2009. Navid has worked on films in German, Persian and English. In the Hollywood production Septembers of Shiraz, which can be seen on Netflix, he plays the part of Morteza next to Adrien Brody and Salma Hayek.

From 2005 until 2010 Navid and his brother Omid produced Persian pop music as "Navid & Omid". They released two studio albums (Faryad & Kolli Sefaresh) as well as several music videos during that time, which all Navid wrote and directed.

Navid has also been working as a music video director for other singers. He has won awards at international filmfestivals with the music videos November's Fall and Habs, which he made for the Iranian legendary singer Ebi. The acclaimed music video Behesht, which Navid wrote and directed for the Iranian superstar Googoosh, gathered international attention since it was the first time a homosexual love story had been portrayed in an Iranian music video. Some of the international articles include the Los Angeles Times, The Guardian, Die Welt, The World, De Volkskrant, The Times of Israel, Huffpost and Euronews.

Navid is also a guest teacher and gives workshops on how to direct actors and produce music videos at the SAE Berlin.

In 2020 he narrated Dalia Sofer's novel Man of My Time for Audible.

Filmography (selection)
 2001: 
 2001: Happy Halloween
 2002: Drei Frauen, ein Plan und die ganz große Kohle
 2003: SK Kölsch
 2003: Fremder Freund
 2003: Wolffs Revier
 2004: SOKO Köln
 2005: Playa del futuro
 2005: Fremde Haut
 2005: König von Kreuzberg
 2006: SOKO Kitzbühel
 2007: Großstadtrevier (Episode Rufmord)
 2008: In letzter Sekunde
 2008: Ein Augenblick Freiheit
 2009: Women Without Men – Zanan-e Bedun-e Mardan
 2009: Salami Aleikum
 2010: Der Kriminalist (Episode Schuld und Sühne)
 2012: Mordkommission Istanbul (Episode Blutsbande)
 2012: Tatort (Episode Ein neues Leben)
 2012: Pastewka (Episode Die Lesung)
 2013: 45 Minuten bis Ramallah
 2013: 
 2014: Die Mamba
 2015: Septembers of Shiraz
 2017: Ferien vom Leben
 2018: Alarm für Cobra 11 – Die Autobahnpolizei (Episode Hooray for Bollywood)
 2018: Tatort (Episode Borowski und das Haus der Geister)
 2019: Die Spezialisten - Im Namen der Opfer
 2020: Professor T.
 2020: Trespassers
 2021: Nachtschicht

Awards
 Nomination at the Filmfest Munich for his performance in Fremder Freund (Category: Best Actor in a Leading Role)
Audience Award at the UMFF for the music video Habs

References

External links
 
 

Living people
1980 births
German male television actors
Iranian male television actors
German male film actors
Iranian male film actors
Iranian emigrants to Germany
People from Tehran
21st-century German male actors